Mr. Saturday Night is a stage musical with music by Jason Robert Brown, lyrics by Amanda Green, and a book by Billy Crystal, Lowell Ganz, and Babaloo Mandel, based on the 1992 film. The musical follows comedian Buddy Young, Jr, decades past his prime, as he attempts a second chance at fame and his family. It premiered at Barrington Stage Company in October 2021. The musical moved to Broadway opening on April 27, 2022 at the Nederlander Theatre.

Production history 
The musical had its world premiere at Barrington Stage Company on October 22, 2021, for a limited run until October 30.

The production began previews on Broadway at the Nederlander Theatre on March 29, 2022, prior to officially opening on April 27. On July 17, 2022, the production announced its closing for September 4, 2022, after 28 previews and 116 performances.

Musical numbers

Barrington Stage (2021)

Act I 
 "Mr. Saturday Night" – Buddy's Singers
 "A Little Joy" – Buddy
 "The Living Room" – Abie & Stan
 "There’s a Chance" – Susan
 "That Guy" – Buddy
 "At Farber’s" – Farber & Ensemble
 "Until Now" – Buddy, Elaine & Stan
 "Timing" – Buddy, Howie, Will & Ronnie
 "What If I Said?" – Annie
 "Unbelievable" – Full Company

Act II 
 "Maybe It Starts With Me" – Susan
 "Tahiti" – Elaine
 "My Wonderful Pain" – Elaine & Buddy
 "Broken" – Stan
 "Any Man But Me" – Buddy
 "Stick Around" – Susan, Elaine, Buddy, Annie & Company

Broadway (2022)

Act I 

 "We're Live" – Bobby, Joey, & Lorraine
 "A Little Joy" – Buddy
 "There's a Chance" – Susan
 "I Still Got It" – Buddy & Stan
 "At Farber's" – Farber, Ramon, & Rebekah
 "Buddy's First Act" – Buddy, Elaine, & Stan
 "Until Now" – Buddy, Elaine, & Stan
 "Timing" – Buddy, Bobby, Joey, & Lorraine
 "What If I Said?" – Annie
 "Unbelievable" – Full Company

Act II 

 "What's Playin' at the Movies" – Bobby, Joey, & Lorraine
 "Maybe It Starts With Me" – Susan
 "Tahiti" – Elaine
 "My Wonderful Pain" – Elaine & Buddy
 "Broken" – Stan
 "Any Man But Me" – Buddy
 "Stick Around" – Susan, Elaine, Buddy, Annie, & Company

Cast and characters

Reception 
The play officially opened on April 27, 2022 with many in the industry attending opening night including Steve Martin, Martin Short, Tina Fey, Jimmy Fallon, Bryan Cranston, and Alex Borstein. 

The show was met with positive reviews from critics particularly for Crystal's lively performance.The New York Times praised Crystal's performance writing, "Crystal is utterly in his element performing live...It's a pleasure to watch." Critic Adam Feldman of Time Out wrote, "By Broadway standards, Mr. Saturday is a modest little show... But it delivers exactly what it promises: Crystal, completely in his element, with a crowd that is more than happy to buy what he’s selling". Variety called it "the funniest show on Broadway in years, if not the most likable." Peter Marks of The Washington Post described the show as "a slender but agreeable Broadway musical" in which the jokes "are old-school funny, polished and impeccably timed".

Awards and nominations

References

External links 
 Official website

Musicals based on films
2021 musicals
Broadway musicals
Musicals by Jason Robert Brown
Works by Billy Crystal